Several airports serve the city of Washington, D.C., in the United States.  Some of these are defunct airports, and some are still active.  Some of these airports are public (owned and operated by a government or governmental authority), some are public use (privately owned, but open to all aircraft), and some are private (privately owned, and only aircraft approved by the private owner may use the airfield).

Active airports:
Ronald Reagan Washington National Airport (IATA: DCA), a public airport serving Washington, D.C., which opened in 1941
College Park Airport, a public airport serving the College Park/Riverdale Park/University Park area is also the oldest, still operating public airport in the United States
Stafford Regional Airport (FAA: RMN), a public airport serving Stafford, Virginia
Washington Executive Airport (FAA: W32), a public use airport near Clinton, Maryland
Baltimore/Washington International Airport (fully Baltimore/Washington International Thurgood Marshall Airport) (IATA: BWI), a public airport serving the Baltimore-Washington, D.C., combined statistical area
Dulles International Airport (IATA: IAD), a public airport in Dulles, Virginia, serving the Washington D.C. metropolitan area

Defunct airports:
Hoover Field, a now-defunct airport which served Washington, D.C., from 1925 to 1933 (its merger with Washington Airport)
Washington Airport, a now-defunct airport which served Washington, D.C., from 1927 to 1933 (its merger with Hoover Field)
Washington-Hoover Airport, a now-defunct airport which served Washington, D.C., from 1933 to 1941

Lists of buildings and structures in Washington, D.C.